Belvin is a surname. Notable people with the surname include:

Harry J. W. Belvin (1900–1986), American educator and politician
Jesse Belvin (1932–1960), American rock and roll singer, pianist, and songwriter
Richard Belvin (born 1941), Bermudian competitive sailor